Tauxières-Mutry is a former commune in the Marne department in north-eastern France. On 1 January 2016, it was merged into the new commune Val de Livre.

Champagne
Its vineyards are located in the Montagne de Reims subregion of Champagne, and are classified as Premier Cru (99%) in the Champagne vineyard classification. Together with Mareuil-sur-Ay it is the highest rated of the Premier Cru villages, and has therefore just missed out on Grand Cru (100%) status.

See also
Communes of the Marne department
Montagne de Reims Regional Natural Park

References

Tauxieresmutry